Karl Gustav Inglist (30 January 1874 in Äntu – 18 November 1951 in Ambla) was an Estonian politician. He was a member of Estonian Constituent Assembly.

References

1874 births
1951 deaths
Members of the Estonian Constituent Assembly
People from Väike-Maarja Parish